The Men's 4 × 50 metre freestyle relay competition of the 2016 FINA World Swimming Championships (25 m) was held on 9 December 2016.

Records
Prior to the competition, the existing world and championship records were as follows.

Results

Heats
The heats were held at 09:30.

Final
The final was held at 18:30.

References

Men's 4 x 50 metre freestyle relay